Hedgpeth was an alternative/indie music festival held in Twin Lakes, Wisconsin, on July 28/29, 2006.

The event is named for one of its organizers, Jeff Hedgpeth.  The festival was held at Shadow Hill Ranch.

Acts
The groups that performed at Hedgpeth 2006 were as follows:
 Primus
 The Flaming Lips
 Kings of Leon
 Rusted Root
 Peeping Tom featuring Mike Patton
 Hot Hot Heat
 They Might Be Giants
 Blue October
 Minus the Bear
 Slightly Stoopid
 Rock Kills Kid
 Jackopierce
 Rocco DeLuca and the Burden
 Living Things
 Los Amigos Invisibles
 Copeland
 Anberlin
 The Go! Team
 The Whigs
 Phantom Planet
 Murder by Death
 The Black Angels
 Luna Halo
 Stephen Kellogg and the Sixers
 Bottle of Justus
 June
 Trampled by Turtles
 Pomeroy
 Domestic Problems
 Sunday Runners
 Devotchka
 Red Letter Agent
 Aberdeen City
 The Apparitions
 Cloud Cult
 Hello Dave
 The Dog and Everything
 Ludo
 theBIV
 Ultra Sonic Edukators
 Trevor Hall
 Freshwater Collins
 The Richard Cranium Sideshow
 The Doomsday Social

The Future of the Festival
Following the 2006 edition, Hedgpeth's future was uncertain, but organizers were optimistic even after the slightly lower than expected turnout. However, the promoters announced the event would not be continued after it lost an estimated $100,000 due to lack of ticket sales.

References

External links
 The official Hedgpeth site
 Hedgpeth on Myspace

Music festivals in Wisconsin
Rock festivals in the United States